Qavamabad (also Romanized as Qavāmābād; also known as Qowmābād and Qumābād) is a village in Kavirat Rural District, Chatrud District, Kerman County, Kerman Province, Iran. At the 2006 census, its population was 883, in 201 families.

References 

Populated places in Kerman County